Stock is the twelfth studio album by Japanese singer Akina Nakamori, released on March 3, 1988. Unlike her previous albums, it has a rock influence, much like Nakamori's idol, Momoe Yamaguchi's latter albums. The main music producer is Kenji Kitajima from the rock band Fence of Defense.

Background
In January 1988, inside the single "Al-Mauj" was included an inquiry letter with information about the prototype title of the upcoming studio album, Fire Water, with "Fire Starter" being a candidate for the single release. However, the title was changed to Stock and "Fire Starter" remained as an album track.

Like the previous studio albums, this does not include any promotional singles, and ten completely new songs were recorded. However, the production of songs had started three years before; these were planned to be released as singles.

Music production consisted of pop-rock-oriented musicians Kenji Kitajima from Fence of Defense, Ryo Aska from Chage and Aska, Tsugutoshi Gotō, Satoshi Nakamura, Yūko Asano, Kisaburo Suzuki, Akira Inoue and Shinji Harada.

Stage performances
Nakamori performed "Farewell" on the Fuji TV music program Yoru no Hit Studio, and "Yume no Fuchi" and "Farewell" on the TV Asahi music program Music Station in early 1988.

Most of the songs have been performed only once, in the live tour Femme Fatale in 1988: "Mada Juubun Janai", "Fire Starter", "Yume no Fuchi", "Nightmare Akumu" and "Crystal Heaven".

Charting performance
The album debuted at number 2 on the Oricon Weekly Album Chart and charted for 16 weeks, selling 395,000 copies. It remained at number 14 on the 1988 Yearly Album Chart.

Track listing

Notes:
All English titles are stylised in all uppercase.

References

1988 albums
Japanese-language albums
Akina Nakamori albums
Warner Music Japan albums